Robert Abate (November 25, 1893 – January 23, 1981) was a Canadian sports coach and the driving force behind the Elizabeth Playground sports teams in Toronto. The Lizzies, as they were known, won more than 150 titles at the city, provincial, and national levels in baseball, basketball, football, and hockey.

Among the players who competed for the Lizzies were Lionel Conacher, Nig Eisen, Goody Rosen and Alex Levinsky.

Abate was affectionately known in the community as (pops abate) for his community work and youth mentorship.

In September 1929, Abate was charged with criminal negligence when a car he was said to have been driving near Bowmanville, Ontario crossed into oncoming traffic and collided with another vehicle. Two 15-year-old members of the Elizabeth Playground bantam baseball team were killed in the accident. Abate initially said he was driving but later said that one of the boys killed in the accident had been behind the wheel. In November, Abate was found guilty of doing grievous bodily harm, and was given a $1,000 fine. His driver's license was suspended for six months.

Abate was inducted into Canada's Sports Hall of Fame in 1976. He died in Kitchener, Ontario in 1981 at age 87. In 1990, the Elizabeth Recreation Centre in Toronto was renamed the Bob Abate Community Recreation Centre.

Abate is survived by his widow (Patricia Abate) 1930-2018, his daughter (Anne Newton) and his grandchildren (Adele Newton, Chissy Newton and Terrence Abate) the late (Laura Abate) passed in 1988.

References

Baseball people from Ontario
Basketball people from Ontario
Canadian sports coaches
Gridiron football people from Ontario
Ice hockey people from Ontario
Sportspeople from Kitchener, Ontario
1893 births
1981 deaths
Place of birth missing